Manoel Victor Cavalcante (23 October 1958 – 12 October 2022) was a Brazilian politician. A member of the Democratic Labour Party, he served in the Legislative Assembly of Santa Catarina from 1991 to 1995.

Cavalcante died on 12 October 2022, at the age of 63.

References

1958 births
2022 deaths
20th-century Brazilian politicians
Democratic Labour Party (Brazil) politicians
Members of the Legislative Assembly of Santa Catarina